Pikes Creek is a census-designated place (CDP) in Lake Township, Luzerne County, Pennsylvania, United States. The population was 269 at the 2010 census.

Geography

It is located at the crossroads of Pennsylvania Route 29 and Pennsylvania Route 118.

The village is named for Pikes Creek, a tributary of Harveys Creek, which flows south to the Susquehanna River at West Nanticoke.

Demographics

References

Census-designated places in Luzerne County, Pennsylvania
Census-designated places in Pennsylvania